Grainger plc is a British-based residential property business. It is headquartered in Newcastle upon Tyne and is a constituent of the FTSE 250 Index.

History
The business was established by the Dickinson family in 1912 as the Grainger Trust to acquire tenanted residential properties in Newcastle upon Tyne. In the 1970s and 1980s it acquired large residential estates from British Coal, British Rail and Reckitt & Coleman. It was first listed on the London Stock Exchange in 1983. In 1989 it acquired Channel Hotels & Properties  and in 2003 it acquired Bradford Property Trust.

From 1987 to 2002, Quentin Wallop, 10th Earl of Portsmouth, was a non-executive director, and as of 1999 he owned 16.55% of the equity, making him the firm's largest shareholder of the company.

In 2006 Grainger entered into a joint venture with Development Securities to develop Curzon Park in Birmingham. In 2007 it changed its name to Grainger plc. In 2008 a consortium of Helical Bar and Grainger was named as the preferred developer for the King Street regeneration scheme in Hammersmith. In 2010, Grainger acquired AIM-listed Sovereign Reversions, an equity release provider, and subsequently formed a 50:50 joint venture with Moorfield, a UK real estate investor, developer and private equity fund manager.

In 2011 the company entered into a development agreement with the Defence Infrastructure Organisation to create the Wellesley Development, which incorporates the Cambridge Military Hospital at Aldershot and which will generate 3,850 homes. In 2019, Grainger was announced as the build-to-rent partner of Transport for London (TfL), which will build new homes on land in TfL's ownership, potentially delivering in excess of 3,000 homes across London.

Operations

As at 30 September 2022 its investment portfolio was valued at £2.8 billion and its development and trading portfolio was valued at £0.5 billion.

References

External links
Official website
Grainger CR Report

Companies based in Newcastle upon Tyne
Real estate companies established in 1912
Property companies of the United Kingdom
Companies listed on the London Stock Exchange
1912 establishments in England